Kastorianos is a kind of a Greek folk dance from Macedonia, Greece. It is very widespread in the cities of Kastoria and Kozani.

See also
Music of Greece
Greek dances

References
Καστοριανός - Musipedia

Greek dances
Macedonia (Greece)